Lakhia is an Indian surname. Notable people with the surname include:

Apoorva Lakhia, Indian film director
Kumudini Lakhia (born 1930), Indian Kathak dancer and choreographer
Aditya Lakhia, Indian actor

Indian surnames